The spirits in prison is a recurrent minor subject in the writings of Christianity.

Greek philosophy

In the Phædrus, Socrates likens the soul of the body to be as imprisoned as an oyster is bound to its shell Joachim Jeremias and others suggested that Peter was making a first reference to Enochic traditions, such as found again in the Second Epistle of Peter chapter 2 and the Epistle of Jude. Stanley E. Porter considers that the broad influence of this interpretation today is due to the support of Edward Selwyn (1946).

Human souls

The concept that the dead await a general resurrection and judgment either in blessed rest or in suffering after a particular judgement at death was a common 1st century Jewish belief (see Lazarus and Dives and bosom of Abraham). A similar concept is taught in the Eastern Orthodox churches, was championed by John Calvin (who vigorously opposed Luther's doctrine of soul sleep), and is reflected in some Early Church Fathers.

In The Church of Jesus Christ of Latter-day Saints, this verse is used in conjunction with 1 Peter 4:6 to support the belief that in the three days between Christ's death and resurrection, He visited the spirit world and set in motion the work of teaching the gospel to those who didn't receive it during mortality, providing them the opportunity to repent and accept saving ordinances performed on their behalf in Latter-day Saint temples.

Other religious traditions
In Islamic tradition, a place called Sijjin  is known to be the prison of unbelieving souls. It is also the place of Satan and his fellow devils. Quran exegete Tabari (839–923 CE) commented on sijjin: "it is the seventh and lowest earth (underworld), in which Satan (Iblis) is chained, and in it are the souls (arwah) of the infidels (kufar). Suyuti (c. 1445–1505 CE) describes it as place of Iblis and his soldiers (Iblis wa junudihi) with the infidels imprisoned.

See also
 Christian views on hell
 Gehenna
 Limbo
 Outer darkness
 Prayer for the dead

References

Christian cosmology
New Testament words and phrases
Bible-related controversies
First Epistle of Peter
Harrowing of Hell
Deities and spirits